The Indianapolis Outing Club is located in Three Lakes, Wisconsin. In 2004, the site was added to the National Register of Historic Places.

History
In 1902, the land that the buildings of the club now sit on was purchased by businessmen from Indiana and Kentucky. By that time, Oneida County, Wisconsin and Vilas County, Wisconsin had the greatest concentration of commercial resorts in the upper area of the Great Lakes region and the businessmen had decided to begin an exclusive club. They would construct four buildings on the site.

References

Clubhouses on the National Register of Historic Places in Wisconsin
Buildings and structures in Oneida County, Wisconsin
Cultural infrastructure completed in 1902
National Register of Historic Places in Oneida County, Wisconsin